Maximum Risk is a 1996 American action thriller film directed by Hong Kong director Ringo Lam in his American directorial debut, and starring Jean-Claude Van Damme and Natasha Henstridge. The film was released in the United States on September 13, 1996.

Plot
A man is chased through the streets of Nice, France, ultimately resulting in his death. A cop, Alain Moreau, is brought by his partner Sebastien to the scene because the victim's face is identical to Alain's. Matches found in his pocket point towards a local hotel, where the proprietor mistakes Alain for "Mikhail Suverov" and gives him the phone message "Call Alex Bohemia." In Mikhail's room is a passport with the same birth date as Alain, and a plane ticket to New York. Alain's mother admits that Alain has a twin brother who she had to give up at birth because she was impoverished. Alain and Sebastian visit the office of the lawyer who adopted Mikhail. They find the room in flames and a large Russian man attacks Alain. Alain escapes with the adoption file, which reveals Mikhail was adopted by a Russian family who immigrated to America. Alain takes the passport and plane ticket to New York to investigate his brother's death and learn more about him.

In New York City, Alain discovers that Mikhail was a member of the Russian Mafia. When he mentions Alex Bohemia, he is referred to the Bohemia Club in Little Odessa. There a woman named Alex Bartlett mistakes him for Mikhail and gives him a key to a hotel room. Wary, Alain rents the room across the hall. When Alex comes to meet him later, he reveals that he is Mikhail's brother. Ivan (who saw Mikhail in the club) and his thugs arrive to kill Alain, believing he is Mikhail. Alain and Alex escape. Alex tells him Mikhail was her boyfriend and he had a plan to leave the Russian Mafia. They go to Mikhail's home, where Alain finds out Mikhail discovered his existence when he saw an article in the paper about his war exploits. After more Russians come to the house, Alain and Alex flee to her friend's cabin.

The next morning, two FBI agents come to the cabin. They say Mikhail kept evidence against the Russian Mafia that he intended to turn over to them, wanting to reform. They want him to pose as Mikhail to access his safe deposit box back in Nice. In actuality, they want to destroy the evidence because it implicates them in colluding with the Russian Mafia. Realizing that the FBI and not the Mafia knew Mikhail was dead, Alain deduces that it was FBI agents who killed Mikhail, and refuses to cooperate. After a fight, Alain handcuffs the agents together and leaves with Alex to visit Kirov, the leader of the Russian Mafia. When he finds them at a banya, Alain tells Kirov that Ivan has been trying to kill him, which enrages Kirov. After Kirov tells Alain the truth about the so-called evidence he has, Ivan sends the big Russian thug from the lawyer's office to kill Kirov and Alain. Kirov dies and Alain escapes in the scuffle; during the pursuit by Ivan, Alain is arrested by NYPD. The two corrupt FBI agents find Alex, bail Alain out of jail and use her to force Alain to access the deposit box.

Bank policy dictates that only Alain himself can access the safe deposit box, forcing the FBI agents to wait outside. In the box is the evidence, thousands in cash, a gun and a tape recording from Mikhail explaining how he decided to escape the mob life and reunite with his family. He instructs a banker to turn over the evidence to the US Embassy, and sets off the sprinkler system to make his escape. Ivan, waiting with Sebastien as his hostage, sends in the big Russian. The thug kills the banker and takes the evidence, but Alain catches up and kills him in the elevator. Outside, police officers block off Ivan's escape, giving Alain time to catch up, shoot out Ivan's tires, and rescue Sebastien; Ivan dies in the wreckage. Alain then chases the FBI agents into a meat locker where he shoots them both and rescues Alex. Mikhail's evidence of Mafia collusion with the FBI leads to several arrests. Alain takes Alex, with whom he is now romantically involved, to meet his mother so she can tell her about Mikhail.

Cast
Jean-Claude Van Damme as Alain Moreau / Mikhail Suverov
Natasha Henstridge as Alex Bartlett
Jean-Hugues Anglade as Sebastien
Zach Grenier as Ivan Dzasokhov
Paul Ben-Victor as Agent Pellman
Frank Senger as Agent Loomis
David Hemblen as Dmitri Kirov
Dan Moran as Yuri
Stefanos Miltsakakis as Red Face
Stéphane Audran as Chantal Moreau

Production
The film was originally known as The Exchange, then it was retitled Bloodstone. Jason Friedberg and Aaron Seltzer, better known for Scary Movie and their other parodies, performed an uncredited rewrite on the film.

Release
Maximum Risk opened on September 13, 1996, at the number one spot at the box office, taking in $5,612,707 in its first weekend, and made a final domestic tally of $14,502,483 and worldwire gross 51.7 million.

Reception
Rotten Tomatoes, a review aggregator, reports that 32% of 37 surveyed critics gave the film a positive review; the average rating was 4.4/10. Audiences polled by CinemaScore gave the film an average grade of "B−" on an A+ to F scale.

Leonard Klady of Variety wrote, "It's a visceral delight that refuses to be deterred by niceties of plot or character consistency and prefers sweat to emotion." Richard Harrington of The Washington Post wrote that the film depends too much on car chases, which end up dominating the film. Lawrence Van Gelder of The New York Times wrote, "From start to finish, 'Maximum Risk' presents spectacular stunts choreographed and coordinated by Charles Picerni and some hair-raising, stomach-churning automotive chases attributed to Remy Julienne, the French master of the art."

Kevin Thomas of the Los Angeles Times called it "a solid, fast-moving action-adventure" in which Van Damme "does some of his best acting yet". Conversely, Peter Stack of the San Francisco Chronicle criticized Van Damme's acting, which is "hobbled by a weak script that even veteran Hong Kong action director Ringo Lam can't salvage".

See also
Double Impact, a 1991 action film which also has Van Damme playing identical twins.

References

External links

1996 films
1996 action thriller films
American action thriller films
Films about the Russian Mafia
Films set in New York City
Films set in Paris
Films set in Ontario
Films set in Philadelphia
Films shot in Toronto
American chase films
Columbia Pictures films
Films directed by Ringo Lam
Films with screenplays by Larry Ferguson
1990s English-language films
1990s American films